The Andromeda Nebula is a 1967 Soviet science fiction film starring Sergei Stolyarov and directed by Yevgeni Sherstobitov at the Dovzhenko Film Studios. The film was originally intended to be the first episode of a series of films, alternatively titled as The Andromeda Nebula: Episode I. Prisoners of the Iron Star, but the remaining parts were never made due to Stolyarov's death.

Plot 
The film is based upon the 1957 novel Andromeda Nebula by Ivan Yefremov. It follows the story of a group of humans on the spaceship Tantra who are tasked with investigating the home planet of an alien race. They discover that artificial radioactivity has killed almost all life on that planet. During the voyage home the ship is trapped by the gravitational force of an iron star and lands on a planet orbiting the star. Surrounded by predators who destroy human nervous system through space suits, the crew has to fight to see Earth again. The film was considered by some in the Soviet Union as being mildly pornographic at time of release and a review in the magazine of the Communist Party of Great Britain, Marxism Today, fifteen years later, noted the "Russian space tits controversy" as an example of "both increasing boundaries of the permissable as well as showing increased censorship in the early Brezhnev era".

Cast

References 
 Wingrove, David. Science Fiction Film Source Book (Longman Group Limited, 1985)

External links

1967 films
1960s science fiction films
Fiction set in the Andromeda Galaxy
Films based on science fiction novels
1960s Russian-language films
Soviet science fiction films
Films set in the 31st century
Films set on fictional planets